The  Mirrer Yeshiva Central Institute, commonly known as the Mir Yeshiva or the Mirrer Yeshiva, is a prominent, Haredi yeshiva located in Brooklyn, New York known for talmudic studies.

The current roshei yeshiva are Rabbi Avrohom Yaakov Nelkenbaum, Rabbi Asher Dov Berenbaum, Rabbi Osher Eliyahu Kalmanowitz, and Rabbi Herschel Zolty. Other notable Maggidei Shiur are Rabbi Elya Brudny, Rabbi Reuven Schepansky, Rabbi Hershel Kaminsky, and Rabbi Tzvi Lobel.

Some students and staff members consider Rabbi Schepansky to be Rosh Yeshiva as well. Rabbi Brudny serves a large public role in addition to his position in the Yeshiva, including sitting on the Moetzes Gedolei Hatorah.

History
See also Mir Yeshiva (Belarus)
The original Mirrer Yeshiva was founded in 1815 in Mir (now in Belarus), and remained in operation there until 1914. With the outbreak of World War I, the yeshiva moved to Poltava (now in Ukraine), under the leadership of Rabbi Eliezer Yehuda Finkel, son of the legendary Rabbi Nosson Tzvi Finkel (the Alter of Slabodka), and son-in-law of Rabbi Elya Boruch Kamai, his renowned predecessor. In 1921, the yeshiva moved back to its original facilities in Mir, where it remained until Nazi Germany invaded Poland in 1939 marking the beginning of the Holocaust. Although many of the foreign-born students left when the Soviet army invaded from the east, the yeshiva continued to operate, albeit on a reduced scale, until the approaching Nazi armies caused the leaders of the yeshiva to move the entire yeshiva community to Keidan, Lithuania. As the Nazi armies continued to push to the east, the yeshiva as a whole eventually fled across Siberia by train to the Far East, and finally reopened in Kobe, Japan, in 1941. Several smaller yeshivos managed to escape alongside the Mir, and, despite the difficulties involved, the overseers of the Mirrer yeshiva undertook full responsibility for their support, distributing funds and securing quarters and food for all the students. A short time later, the yeshiva relocated again, to (Japanese-controlled) Shanghai, China, where they remained until the end of World War II. The heroism of the Japanese consul-general in Lithuania, Chiune Sugihara, who issued several thousand transit visas to Jews, permitting them to travel in order to flee to Japan, has been the subject of several books.

Following the end of the war, the majority of the Jewish refugees from Shanghai ghetto left for Mandate Palestine and the United States. Among them were the survivors from the Mir Yeshiva, who re-established the yeshiva, this time with two campuses, one in Jerusalem, Israel, and one in Brooklyn, New York.

Brooklyn
The yeshiva settled in New Lots section of East New York before moving to their current location on Ocean Parkway in Flatbush. The rosh yeshiva was Rabbi Avraham Kalmanowitz, who led the yeshiva for almost 20 years. He died in 1964. His position of rosh yeshiva was filled by his son Rabbi Shraga Moshe Kalmanowitz and his son-in-law, Rabbi Shmuel Berenbaum.
Rabbi Shraga Moshe died in 1998 and Rabbi Shmuel in 2008. Among the rabbis who taught at the yeshiva were Rabbi Dovid Kviat, author of the Sefer Sukkas Dovid, and Rabbi Shmuel Brudny.

Rabbi Moshe Handelsman was the longtime executive director of the yeshiva. He died in 2022 at the age 92.

The yeshiva is officially registered with the College Board as the Mirrer Yeshiva Central Institute. It is currently undergoing construction, building a new dormitory, a new beis midrash, and more.

Notable faculty
The yeshiva's long-time Rosh Yeshiva was Rabbi Shmuel Berenbaum, who died on January 6, 2008. Rabbi Berenbaum was a son-in-law of the founder of the Brooklyn branch of the Mir Yeshiva, Rabbi Avraham Kalmanowitz. Mayor Michael Bloomberg issued a statement praising Berenbaum, noting that he built the Jewish academy "into one of the largest centers for Torah study in the world." Steven Bayme, national director of contemporary Jewish life at the American Jewish Congress said the yeshiva helped preserve "a world that was otherwise lost."

The yeshiva is currently led by Rabbi Avraham Yaakov Nelkenbaum, son-in-law of Rabbi Avraham Kalmanowitz; Rabbi Asher Eliyahu Kalmanowitz, son of Rabbi Shraga Moshe Kalmanowitz; Rabbi Hershel Zolty, son in law of Rabbi Shraga Moshe;  and Rabbi Asher Dov Berenbaum, son of Rabbi Shmuel Berenbaum. The mashgiach is Rabbi Ezriel Erlanger. The yeshiva currently includes an elementary school, a high school, a beis midrash, and a kollel. The kollel is led by Rabbi Eliezer Ginsburg and the high school by a son-in-law of Rabbi Shraga Moshe Kalmanowitz.

Prominent alumni

References

 Toldot Yeshivat Mir, Zinowitz, M., Tel Aviv, 1981.

External links
 Reeva Kimble's "Brief History of the Jews of Mir"
 MirrerYeshiva (at)The Jnet (dot)com

1945 establishments in New York City
Belarusian-Jewish culture in New York City
Educational institutions established in 1945
Flatbush, Brooklyn
Haredi Judaism in New York (state)
Jewish seminaries
Mirrer Yeshiva Central Institute
Mir Yeshiva
Orthodox yeshivas in Brooklyn